The MC6847 is a video display generator (VDG) first introduced by Motorola and used in the TRS-80 Color Computer, Dragon 32/64, Laser 200, TRS-80 MC-10/Matra Alice, NEC PC-6000 series, Acorn Atom, and the APF Imagination Machine, among others. It is a relatively simple display generator compared to other display chips of the time. It is capable of displaying alphanumeric text, semigraphics and raster graphics contained within a roughly square display matrix 256 pixels wide by 192 lines high.

The ROM includes a 5 x 7 pixel font, compatible with 6-bit ASCII. Effects such as inverse video or colored text (green on dark green; orange on dark orange) are possible.
twelve colors: black, green, yellow, blue, red, buff (almost-but-not-quite white), cyan, magenta, and orange (two extra colors, dark green and dark orange, are the ink colours for all alphanumeric text mode characters, and a light orange color is available as an alternative to green as the background color).

The low display resolution is a necessity of using television sets as display monitors. Making the display wider risked cutting off characters due to overscan. Compressing more dots into the display window would easily exceed the resolution of the television and be useless.

Signal levels and color palette
The chip outputs a NTSC-compatible progressive scan signal composed of one field of 262 lines 60 times per second.

According to the MC6847 datasheet, colors are formed by the combination of three signals:  luminance,  chroma and  chroma, according to the YPbPr color space. These signals can drive a TV directly, or be used with a NTSC modulator (Motorola MC1372) for RF output.

 may assume one of these voltages: "Black" = 0.72V; "White Low" = 0.65V; "White Medium" = 0.54V; "White High" = 0.42V.

The following table shows the signal values used:

Notes:
  
1) The colors shown are adjusted for maximum brightness and only approximate (different color spaces are used on TV - BT601 and web pages - sRGB).

2) At least on the Color Computer 1 and 2, the alternate palette of text modes (actually the text portion of semigraphic modes) was dark pink (or dark red) on light pink, of shades not listed here (and no dark orange), whereas the Color Computer 3, with a different chip, made it dark orange on orange.

The first eight colors of this table were numbered 0 to 7 in the upper bits of the character set (when bit 7 was set, bits 4-6 represented the color number), but ColorBASIC's numbering was 1 higher than that in text mode, as it used 0 for black.

Video modes 
Possible MC6847 video display modes:

Character generator
The built-in character generator ROM offers 64 ASCII characters with 5x7 pixels. Characters can be green or orange, on dark green or orange background, with a possible "invert" attribute (dark character on a bright background).

An updated version of the chip (MC6847T1) was capable of generating lowercase characters.

See also
 Motorola 6845, video address generator
 Thomson EF9345
 TMS9918
 MOS Technology VIC-II
 List of home computers by video hardware

References

Graphics chips
6847